The eighth season of M*A*S*H aired Mondays at 9:00–9:30 pm on CBS.

Cast

Note: Gary Burghoff appeared in four episodes of the season as Cpl. Walter "Radar" O'Reilly before leaving the series.

Episodes

Notes

External links 
 List of M*A*S*H (season 8) episodes at the Internet Movie Database

1979 American television seasons
1980 American television seasons
MASH 08